Klesie Kelly, or Klesie Kelly-Moog, is an American soprano and voice teacher at the Musikhochschule Köln and for international master classes.

Career 

Born in Kentucky, Kelly studied voice in Germany with Bettina Björgsten, Helmut Kretschmar and Günther Weißenborn. More active in concert than on the opera stage, she has collaborated with conductors such as Moshe Atzmon, Wolfgang Gönnenwein, Erich Leinsdorf, Bruno Maderna and Hiroshi Wakasugi.

In 1971, Kelly appeared at the Mozartsaal of the Konzerthaus in Vienna, singing Lieder by Purcell, Schubert and Strauss, among others, accompanied by Norman Shetler. She recorded songs by composers including Mozart, Schumann, Wolf and Zemlinsky with pianist Werner Genuit. In 1977, she recorded evening songs and love songs (Abendlieder, Liebeslieder und Romanzen) with tenor Ian Partridge, accompanied by instrumental soloists including Hermann Baumann (horn), Dieter Klöcker (clarinet), Karl-Otto Hartmann (bassoon) and again Genuit.

In Wiesbaden, she sang with the choir Rheingauer Kantorei, both in 1979 Mendelssohn's oratorio Elias with the  alongside Erich Wenk in the title part, and in 1980 Honegger's , with Claudia Eder and Gerd Nienstedt as the narrator.

Kelly has been a professor of voice at the Musikhochschule Köln from 1986. She has taught master classes in Europe and Korea. Her students have included Juan Carlos Echeverry, Julia Kleiter,  and Christiane Oelze. Several of her students were awarded at international competitions and are members of leading opera companies.

References 

Living people
American sopranos
Place of birth missing (living people)
Singers from Kentucky
Year of birth missing (living people)
Voice teachers
Kentucky women musicians

Women music educators
21st-century American women